Saint Aubert is an unincorporated community in Osage County, in the U.S. state of Missouri. Variant names were "Medora" and "Shipleys Landing".

History
Saint Aubert was originally called Medora, and under the latter name was platted in 1855, and named after Medora Morrow, the wife of a first settler.  A post office called Medora was established in 1858, the name was changed to Saint Aubert in 1893, and the post office closed in 1935. The present name is a transfer from St. Aubert Township, Callaway County, Missouri.

References

Unincorporated communities in Osage County, Missouri
Unincorporated communities in Missouri
Jefferson City metropolitan area